Nasira is a feminine given name, commonly found in the Arabic language. The masculine counterpoint of the name is Nasir. Nasira may refer to:

People 
 Hani Nasira, Egyptian author and journalist, Muslim scholar
 Nasira Iqbal, Pakistani retired judge of Lahore High Court
 Nasira Zuberi, Pakistani television personality

Other 

Disney's Aladdin in Nasira's Revenge, a 2000 video game
 an-Nāṣira, the Arabic name for the city of Nazareth, Israel